Marvel's Guardians of the Galaxy is a 2021 action-adventure game developed by Eidos-Montréal. It was published by Square Enix at launch, but publishing transferred to Eidos-Montréal in February 2023 due to the developer's acquisition by Embracer Group. Based on the Marvel Comics superhero team Guardians of the Galaxy, the game was released for PlayStation 4, PlayStation 5, Windows, Xbox One, Xbox Series X/S, and Nintendo Switch via cloud streaming on October 26, 2021.

Marvel's Guardians of the Galaxy received favorable reviews from critics, with praise for its narrative, presentation, and characters, but some criticism for its combat. In 2022, Square Enix stated the game failed to meet its sales expectations.

Gameplay 

In Marvel's Guardians of the Galaxy, the player assumes control of Peter Quill / Star-Lord from a third-person perspective. The player can utilize Star-Lord's elemental guns to defeat enemies. His blasters have four alternate firing modes. Ice shots temporarily freeze enemies, lightning shots stun them, wind shots pull enemies far away towards Star-Lord, and Plasma shots induce fire damages to boss characters. Other members of the titular team, which include Gamora, Rocket Raccoon, Groot, and Drax the Destroyer, are not directly playable as they are controlled by artificial intelligence. Players can enter Guardians Mode in order to issue commands to them during combat. Each character has four unique skills and abilities which can be chained together to inflict more damage. Groot has excellent crowd control abilities in which he can use his roots to immobilize enemies, while Rocket Raccoon can deploy various explosives and bombs. Drax can easily stagger enemies, while Gamora can use her sword to deal powerful damages against a single opponent. However, these abilities have a short cooldown time. Guardians can also use environmental hazards to their advantage. For instance, players can instruct Drax to hurl a large boulder at enemies.

As Star-Lord and the Guardians engage in combat, the player's performance will be rated using the Momentum gauge. Once the player has maximized the team's momentum, they can perform a "Call-to-Action" attack, which deals significant damages to stronger enemies. Certain enemies has a "stagger bar". Once an opponent's stagger bar is depleted, they will be temporarily stunned, opening a window for players to attack. Once the enemy is defeated, they will drop health pick-ups, which will refill Star-Lord's health. As the player progresses in the game, they will earn experience points. These points can be used to unlock new abilities for both Star-Lord and other Guardians. As the player fight enemies, a meter will build up and allow players to unleash a special ability known as "Team Huddle", which briefly stops combat and prompts Star-Lord to make a motivational speech and play a song to inspire his teammates. A good speech will grant the other Guardians gameplay benefits, though Star-Lord's abilities will be boosted regardless of the quality of the speech.

While the game is mostly linear, players are encouraged to explore each location in order to find components, collectibles, and costumes. Players can use Star-Lord's visor to scan the environment and identify objects of interest. At workbenches, Rocket can use these components to craft combat perks for Star-Lord, such as granting him passive advantages such as increased health and shield regeneration. The player needs to use Star-Lord's jet boots to navigate the environment. Occasionally, players also need to recruit the help of other Guardians in order to progress. For instance, Rocket can use his engineering skills to open locked doors, allowing the team to reach areas which are otherwise inaccessible. At various points of the game, the player can make key decisions, via dialogue trees, that will affect the relationships between the Guardians and the outcomes of certain missions. Throughout the game, Star-Lord's decisions will be referenced by his teammates. Despite the branching dialogue paths, the core story remains the same and the game has one ending.

Synopsis

Characters 
Marvel's Guardians of the Galaxy features the titular team, the Guardians of the Galaxy, featuring: Peter Quill / Star-Lord (Jon McLaren), a Terran-Spartoi hybrid and leader of the group; Gamora (Kimberly-Sue Murray), the "deadliest woman in the galaxy" and adopted daughter of Thanos; Rocket (Alex Weiner), a former bounty hunter, weapons specialist, and inventor; Groot (Robert Montcalm), Rocket's loyal partner and fellow former bounty hunter, who is the last of his species; and Drax the Destroyer (Jason Cavalier), famed throughout the galaxy as the killer of Thanos.

Opposing the group is the Universal Church of Truth, led by Grand Unifier Raker (Andreas Apergis), and the Lethal Legion, a group of bounty hunters including the Blood Brothers (Kwasi Songui and Christian Jadah) and Captain Glory (Danny Blanco Hall) hired by Lady Hellbender (Sarah Levesque). The Guardians also face the beasts Dweller-in-Darkness, Lady Hellbender's pet, and Fin-Fang-Foom, a legendary dragon.

Other characters include Peter Quill's former lover and Nova Corp Centurion Ko-Rel (Judith Baribeau), Ko-Rel's daughter Nikki Gold (Romane Denis), the "Celestial Madonna"  Mantis (Emmanuelle Lussier Martinez), security chief Cosmo the Spacedog (Alex Ivanovici) of Knowhere, the Xandarian Worldmind (Robert Montcalm and Leni Parker), and Adam Warlock (Brent Skagford), the first deity figure of the Universal Church of Truth.

Setting
The plot of Marvel's Guardians of the Galaxy takes place several years after a massive interstellar war that raged across the universe. Among those looking to survive in a tumultuous Andromeda galaxy are the newly incorporated "heroes for hire", the Guardians of the Galaxy, who all hope to make quick money during their adventurous wanderings around the galaxy. However, while attempting to capture a beast for a wealthy collector, a seemingly harmless bet between two team members inadvertently sets in motion a series of catastrophic events that threaten the peace of the fragile universe unless the team takes responsibility for their actions and eradicates the threat.

Plot
On Peter Quill's 13th birthday, his mother Meredith gifts him the Element Guns, rare Spartoi weapons left behind by his father. That same day, Chitauri warriors attack the Quill household, kidnapping Peter and killing Meredith. Many years later, Peter becomes a mercenary named Star-Lord and leads the Guardians of the Galaxy. In order to make money, the Guardians head into the forbidden Quarantine Zone, established by the Nova Corps to store debris from the war, so they can capture a rare monster for their patron, Lady Hellbender. However, they are forced to flee the Quarantine Zone when Peter picks up a yellow gem he finds and accidentally releases an unidentified alien entity. The Guardians flee but are intercepted by the Nova Corps patrol ship Hala's Hope, captained by Centurion Ko-Rel, Peter's former lover. Ko-Rel detains the Guardians alongside Grand Unifier Raker of the Universal Church of Truth, who was also caught trespassing in the Quarantine Zone to search for his church's "golden god". While being processed, Peter also meets a young Nova Corps cadet named Nikki Gold, who happens to be Ko-Rel's daughter, leading Peter to suspect that he might be Nikki's father. Ko-Rel agrees to give the Guardians three cycles to pay their hefty fine.

Being completely broke, the Guardians decide to scam Lady Hellbender by selling one of their own. The plan goes awry however and the Guardians are forced to flee, though not before obtaining the money necessary to cover their fine. Enraged, Lady Hellbender swears revenge and hires the Lethal Legion to pursue them. The Guardians then travel to "The Rock", a Nova Corps outpost where Hala's Hope is docked, but find that several Nova Corps officers stationed there, claiming that they must spread the "Promise", have mutinied. The Hala's Hope leaves the station and the Guardians decide to flee to Knowhere, where Quill plans to ask Cosmo the Spacedog for help. Cosmo arrests the Guardians after they get into a fight with the Blood Brothers, but Peter makes a deal with Cosmo to investigate the Hala's Hope, which is now transmitting a mysterious signal, if Cosmo agrees to get the charges against them dropped.

The Guardians board the Hala's Hope, and find a massive cannon siphoning "Faith Energy" from the planet below. They are then captured by Raker, who takes them to meet the "Matriarch" of his Church; to Peter's horror, the Matriarch is Nikki. Nikki is in possession of the yellow gem, which allows her to brainwash thousands of alien followers with the "Promise", trapping them in illusions crafted from their deepest desires, and harnessing their devotion as Faith Energy to power the Church's fleet of ships and machines. Nikki tries to tempt the Guardians with the Promise, but they each manage to resist and break free before escaping the Church, although Drax is still shaken by what he witnessed in his Promise, and Peter learns that Ko-Rel was killed by the mysterious entity he previously released.

The Guardians are attacked by a fleet of Lethal Legion warships, but manage to defeat them. They attempt to enlist the help of the Xandarian Worldmind, but it concludes that the Church's victory is inevitable and flees the galaxy with the remaining Nova Corps. Drax then succumbs to the Promise, and imprisons the team. With help from Mantis, the Guardians enter Drax's mind and force him to accept that the Promise is not real. They also encounter Adam Warlock, the Church's original "golden god" who faked his death and went into hiding on Mantis' planet. Warlock reveals that the alien entity controlling Nikki is in fact his dark side, Magus, whom he sealed in the yellow gem–the Soul Stone–to keep contained. Magus is manipulating Raker and the Church to gather Faith Energy on which he can feed.

With no other options, the Guardians turn to Lady Hellbender for help. They subdue and gift the legendary monster Fin Fang Foom for her, and she agrees to aid in an assault on the Church's flagship, the Sacrosanct. During their assault, Raker traps the Guardians in an energy field, but Peter is able to enter Nikki's Promise. With the help of Ko-Rel's spirit–who reveals Nikki is an adopted war orphan and not Peter's daughter–Peter convinces Nikki to accept Ko-Rel's death, freeing her from her Promise and Magus' control, while also unlocking her hidden powers. The Guardians kill Raker while Warlock absorbs Magus back into his body, ending the threat of the Church. As the galaxy celebrates being freed from the Church's brainwashing, the Guardians take their leave, with Nikki becoming their newest member.

Magus proves to be too much for Warlock to contain, however, and takes over his body. Guided by Mantis, Peter risks his own life by physically wielding the Soul Stone to imprison Magus once again. Warlock thanks the Guardians for their help and takes custody of the Soul Stone, promising to come to them for help should he need it. Peter contemplates how to take care of Nikki as the Guardians set off to handle their next assignment: printing new business cards. If, however, the Guardians never paid their Nova Corp fine, the ship is suddenly disabled by a Nova Corps tracker and the team is left stranded in space.

Development 
Marvel's Guardians of the Galaxy was developed by Eidos-Montréal, the developer behind the Deus Ex reboot series. Star-Lord was chosen as the game's lead character because he is the "human heart" of the Guardians and the member that Eidos Montreal most identify with. The team decided against adding multiplayer modes, as they felt that the Guardians are a group of colorful personalities, and by positioning Star-Lord at the heart of most social interactions, the player can better experience the dynamics of the team by having these unpredictable characters react to the Star-Lord's choice. While Star-Lord is the team's leader, other characters may disagree with his decision and make choices on their own, and the player also need to react to other players' decisions. The team believed that this can further highlight the rest of the Guardians' personality and character. The system was inspired by real-world team work where people must work, negotiate and bargain with each other. Deus Ex served as a major inspiration for the game's campaign, as player's decision will be impactful and lead to different outcomes. The game is powered by the Dawn Engine that was earlier implemented in Deus Ex: Mankind Divided.

Release 
Marvel's Guardians of the Galaxy was first reported on in January 2017, when Marvel Entertainment announced that it had partnered with Square Enix to produce various games based on Marvel properties. The game was officially announced at E3 2021, and was released for Nintendo Switch, PlayStation 4, PlayStation 5, Windows, Xbox One, and Xbox Series X and Series S on October 26, 2021. The Nintendo Switch version is a cloud-based title. The Windows version was produced in collaboration with D3T, a British game development studio. The game would not feature any microtransactions and Eidos did not plan to release any downloadable content for the game.

Reception 

Marvel's Guardians of the Galaxy received "generally favorable reviews" according to review aggregator Metacritic; the cloud version for Nintendo Switch received "mixed or average" reviews.

IGN praised the story of the game, writing that it "nicely balances a goofy, action-filled adventure with some genuinely heartfelt story moments, and the choices you're given can add some surprising personal twists to your particular playthrough." GameSpot disliked how the combat felt shallow, with it being easy to win by spamming buttons, with it becoming boring by the end of the game: "And so fights ultimately devolve into ever-longer grind-fests as the number of enemies grow more plentiful and their health bars extend ever longer."

Chris Carter of Destructoid was mixed about the characters, feeling that the performances never quite reached the heights of their movie counterparts. Game Informers Andrew Reiner praised the environments, saying, "The worlds steal the eye with their wildly colored and oddly designed vistas".

It was the second best-selling boxed game in the UK in its launch release, only behind FIFA 22. In February 2022, despite acknowledging "strong reviews", Square Enix stated that the game's sales had failed to meet their expectations.

Awards and accolades

Notes

References

External links 
 

2021 video games
Action-adventure games
Cloud-based Nintendo Switch games
Eidos-Montréal games
Interactive Achievement Award winners
Nintendo Switch games
PlayStation 4 games
PlayStation 5 games
Single-player video games
Square Enix games
The Game Awards winners
Video games about extraterrestrial life
Video games based on Guardians of the Galaxy
Video games developed in Canada
Video games set in Missouri
Video games set on fictional planets
Windows games
Xbox One games
Xbox Series X and Series S games
D.I.C.E. Award for Adventure Game of the Year winners